Matthew Kay may refer to:

 Matty Kay (born 1989), English footballer
 Matthew Kay (cricketer) (born 1982), English cricketer